Hendricus "Henk" Vogels (born 31 July 1973, in Perth) is an Australian former professional road bicycle racer who retired from competition at the end of the 2008 season, riding with the Toyota–United Pro Cycling Team. He won the Australian national road race title in 1999. He was an Australian Institute of Sport scholarship holder. He was subsequently directeur sportif of the Fly V-Successful Living team. Vogels also provides expert opinion for SBS Cycling Central. Vogels served as sports director of the  team in 2014, however he left the team at the end of the season in order to take a break from the sport in 2015 and spend more time with his family. In 2019 he was announced as the sports director of the Australian ARA Pro Racing cycling team, based in Queensland.

His father, Henk Vogels Sr, was a former Australian cyclist who competed in the team pursuit at the 1964 Summer Olympics.

Major results

1994
 1st Stage 1 Commonwealth Bank Classic
1995
 1st Stage 14, Herald Sun Tour
1996
 1st Stage 6, Tour de l'Avenir
 1st Stage 2, Wien-Rabenstein-Gresten-Wien
1997
 1st Duo Normand (with Cyril Bos)
 3rd Paris–Tours
 3rd Stage 21 Tour de France
 10th Paris–Roubaix
1998
 10th Paris–Roubaix
1999
 1st  National Road Race Champion
2000
 1st First Union USPRO Championships
 1st Clásica Internacional de Alcobendas
 1st Zomergem-Adinkerke
 1st Stage 2, Vuelta a Asturias
 1st Stage 1, Vuelta a La Rioja
 1st Stage 1, Herald Sun Tour
2001
 1st Overall  Grand Prix Cycliste de Beauce
1st Stage 3
 1st Stage 7 Herald Sun Tour
 1st Stage 11 Herald Sun Tour
2002
 1st Stage 6a, Grand Prix Cycliste de Beauce
 1st Stage 12, Herald Sun Tour
 1st USPRO Criterium Championships
2003
 1st Stage 1, Tour of Georgia
 2nd Gent–Wevelgem

References

External links 
VELOBIOS Rider Profile

http://www.sbs.com.au/cyclingcentral/

1973 births
Living people
Australian male cyclists
Australian people of Dutch descent
Cyclists from Perth, Western Australia
Sportsmen from Western Australia
Australian Institute of Sport cyclists
Olympic cyclists of Australia
Cyclists at the 2000 Summer Olympics
Commonwealth Games medallists in cycling
Commonwealth Games gold medallists for Australia
Cyclists at the 1994 Commonwealth Games
Medallists at the 1994 Commonwealth Games